The Symphony No. 1 (originally titled: Sinfonia), Op. 24, is an orchestral composition by the Finnish composer Aulis Sallinen, who began writing the piece in 1970 when the City of Helsinki announced a composers' competition to mark the inauguration of Finlandia Hall. Completing the symphony in 1971, Sallinen was awarded First Prize in the contest; the Helsinki Philharmonic Orchestra and its music director, Jorma Panula, premiered the work at Finlandia Hall during the 2 December inaugural festivities.

Composition

History

Structure

Instrumentation 
According to the publisher, Novello & Co, Symphony No. 1 is scored for the following:
Woodwind: 3 flutes (1 doubling piccolo), 3 oboes, 3 clarinets in B (1 doubling B bass clarinet), 2 bassoons, 1 contrabassoon
Brass: 4 horns in F, 3 trumpets in B, 2 trombones, 1 bass trombone
Percussion: timpani, 4 percussionists (bass drum, snare drum, wood blocks, tam-tam, cymbals, glockenspiel, marimba, vibraphone, tubular bells)
Strings: violins, violas, cellos, double basses, harp

Reception

Notable performances

Recordings 
To date, Symphony No. 1 has received two recordings, the first of which is from 1972 with Okko Kamu conducting the Finnish Radio Symphony Orchestra on the BIS label. Finnish conductor Ari Rasilainen has also recorded the symphony as part of cpo's compendium of Sallinen's orchestral works. The First Symphony joins the Seventh (Op. 71, 1996), Chorali (Op. 22, 1970), and A Solemn Overture (Op. 75, 1997) on the first volume of the cpo series.

Notes, references, and sources

Notes

References

Sources 

Books

CD liner notes

Journal articles

External links 
 1971 recording of Sallinen's Symphony No. #1

Symphonies by Aulis Sallinen
1971 compositions
Sallinen 1